Anne-Armande de Crequy née de Saint Gelais de Lansac (1637-1709) was a French court official. She served as Première dame d'honneur to the queen of France, Maria Theresa of Spain, from 1679 until 1683.

Life
Anne-Armande de Crequy was the daughter of Councillor Gilles de Saint Gelais, marquis de Lansac and de Ballon, and Marie de La Vallée-Fossez, and married duke Charles III de Créquy in 1653. 

In 1679, she was appointed to the office of Première dame d'honneur to the new queen of France, and as such responsible for the female courtiers, controlling the budget, purchases, annual account and staff list, daily routine and presentations to the queen. She was appointed because of the rank of her spouse, when her predecessor was transferred to the household of the new dauphine by recommendation of madame de Maintenon. Anne-Armande de Crequy is described as a meek and pious beauty who avoided all conflicts and was treated with respect and consideration by most people at court.   When she became a widow in 1687, she left court and lived the rest of her life in secluded retirement in the country. 

Anne-Armande de Crequy is mentioned in the memoirs of the time.

References 

 Marie de Rabutin-Chantal Sévigné,Monmerqué,  Lettres de Madame de Sévigné de sa famille et de ses amis, Volym 9
 Anselme de Sainte-Marie,Ange de Sainte-Rosalie,  Histoire de la Maison Royale de France, et des grands officiers de la Couronne
 Hyacinthe Dusevel,  Lettres sur le département de la Somme. Troisième édition, revue et augmentèe
 Louis de Rouvroy Saint-Simon,Cheruel,Sainte-Beuve,  Mémoires complets et authentiques du duc de Saint-Simon sur le siècle de ...

1637 births
1709 deaths
17th-century French people
French ladies-in-waiting
Household of Maria Theresa of Spain